Peltephilus, the horned armadillo, is an extinct genus of dog-sized, armadillo xenarthran mammals which first inhabited Argentina during the Oligocene epoch, and became extinct in the Miocene epoch. Notably, the scutes on its head were so developed that they formed horns. Aside from  the horned gophers of North America, it is the only known fossorial horned mammal.

Although it had traditionally been perceived as a carnivore because of its large, triangular-shaped teeth, Vizcaino and Farina argued in 1997 that Peltephilus was a herbivore.

Taxonomy 
The genus was originally classified as belonging to the family Chlamyphoridae, but in 2007 was placed in its own family Peltephilidae by Darin A. Croft, John J. Flynn and Andre Wyss.

Distribution 
Fossils of Peltephilus have been found in:

Deseadan
 Argentina - Sarmiento Formation
 Bolivia - Salla Formation

Miocene
 Argentina - Colloncuran Collón Curá Formation and Santacrucian Santa Cruz Formation
 Bolivia - Colloncuran Nazareno Formation
 Chile - Santacrucian Chucal Formation

References

Bibliography 
 
 
 

Prehistoric placental genera
Prehistoric cingulates
Oligocene xenarthrans
Miocene xenarthrans
Miocene genus extinctions
Oligocene genus first appearances
Oligocene mammals of South America
Miocene mammals of South America
Mayoan
Laventan
Colloncuran
Friasian
Santacrucian
Colhuehuapian
Deseadan
Paleogene Argentina
Neogene Argentina
Fossils of Argentina
Cañadón Asfalto Basin
Golfo San Jorge Basin
Paleogene Bolivia
Neogene Bolivia
Fossils of Bolivia
Neogene Chile
Fossils of Chile
Fossil taxa described in 1887
Taxa named by Florentino Ameghino
Sarmiento Formation